Hego Fuchino  (1888–1961) was an architect from Hawaii. He designed the Makiki Christian Church, the Izumo Taishakyo Mission, and the Hawaii Shingon Mission.

Biography 
Fuchino was born in Saga, Japan in 1888. He immigrated to Hawaii in 1905 or 1906, and studied civil engineering at the University of Hawaii. After graduation, Fuchino taught himself architecture and opened up an engineering firm.

Fuchino built many iconic buildings in Hawaii. In 1919, Fuchino designed the Nippon Theater, and the Kaimuki Playhouse in 1922. In 1929 he renovated the Hawaii Shingon Mission. In 1931 he designed the Hale’iwa Theatre and the Makiki Christian church.

In December 1941, after the bombing of Pearl Harbor, Fuchino was one of many Japanese community leaders in Hawaii who was arrested and interned on the mainland.

Fuchino died in 1961.

References 

Japanese emigrants to the United States
American architects
1888 births

1961 deaths
People from Saga Prefecture
University of Hawaiʻi at Mānoa alumni